= Muhammad Saeed Sayf =

Yemeni writer

Muhammad Saeef Sayd is a Yemeni writer. His fiction piece "Waiting" has been translated into English and appeared in a 1988 anthology of modern Arabian literature.
